Billboard (stylized as billboard) is an American music and entertainment magazine published weekly by Penske Media Corporation. The magazine provides music charts, news, video, opinion, reviews, events, and style related to the music industry. Its music charts include the Hot 100, the 200, and the Global 200, tracking the most popular albums and songs in different genres of music. It also hosts events, owns a publishing firm, and operates several TV shows.

Billboard was founded in 1894 by William Donaldson and James Hennegan as a trade publication for bill posters. Donaldson later acquired Hennegan's interest in 1900 for $500. In the early years of the 20th century, it covered the entertainment industry, such as circuses, fairs, and burlesque shows, and also created a mail service for travelling entertainers. Billboard began focusing more on the music industry as the jukebox, phonograph, and radio became commonplace. Many topics it covered were spun-off into different magazines, including Amusement Business in 1961 to cover outdoor entertainment, so that it could focus on music. After Donaldson died in 1925, Billboard was passed down to his children and Hennegan's children, until it was sold to private investors in 1985, and has since been owned by various parties.

History

Early history

The first issue of Billboard was published in Cincinnati, Ohio, by William Donaldson and James Hennegan on November 1, 1894. Initially, it covered the advertising and bill posting industry, and was known as Billboard Advertising. At the time, billboards, posters, and paper advertisements placed in public spaces were the primary means of advertising. Donaldson handled editorial and advertising, while Hennegan, who owned Hennegan Printing Co., managed magazine production. The first issues were just eight pages long. The paper had columns like "The Bill Room Gossip" and "The Indefatigable and Tireless Industry of the Bill Poster". A department for agricultural fairs was established in 1896. The Billboard Advertising publication was renamed The Billboard in 1897.

After a brief departure over editorial differences, Donaldson purchased Hennegan's interest in the business in 1900 for $500 (equal to $ today) to save it from bankruptcy. On May 5, Donaldson changed it from a monthly to a weekly paper with  a greater emphasis on breaking news. He improved editorial quality and opened new offices in New York, Chicago, San Francisco, London, and Paris, and also re-focused the magazine on outdoor entertainment such as fairs, carnivals, circuses, vaudeville, and burlesque shows. A section devoted to circuses was introduced in 1900, followed by more prominent coverage of outdoor events in 1901. Billboard also covered topics including regulation, a lack of professionalism, economics, and new shows. It had a "stage gossip" column covering the private lives of entertainers, a "tent show" section covering traveling shows, and a sub-section called "Freaks to order". According to The Seattle Times, Donaldson also published news articles "attacking censorship, praising productions exhibiting 'good taste' and fighting yellow journalism".

As railroads became more developed, Billboard set up a mail forwarding system for traveling entertainers. The location of an entertainer was tracked in the paper's Routes Ahead column, then Billboard would receive mail on the star's behalf  and publish a notice in its "Letter-Box" column that it had mail for them. This service was first introduced in 1904, and became one of Billboards largest sources of profit and celebrity connections. By 1914, there were 42,000 people using the service. It was also used as the official address of traveling entertainers for draft letters during World War I. In the 1960s, when it was discontinued, Billboard was still processing 1,500 letters per week.

In 1920, Donaldson made a controversial move by hiring African-American journalist James Albert Jackson to write a weekly column devoted to African-American performers. According to The Business of Culture: Strategic Perspectives on Entertainment and Media, the column identified discrimination against black performers and helped validate their careers. Jackson was the first black critic at a national magazine with a predominantly white audience. According to his grandson, Donaldson also established a policy against identifying performers by their race. Donaldson died in 1925.

Focus on music
Billboards editorial changed focus as technology in recording and playback developed, covering "marvels of modern technology" such as the phonograph and wireless radios. It began covering coin-operated entertainment machines in 1899, and created a dedicated section for them called "Amusement Machines" in March 1932. Billboard began covering the motion picture industry in 1907, but ended up focusing on music due to competition from Variety. It created a radio broadcasting station in the 1920s.

The jukebox industry continued to grow through the Great Depression, and was advertised heavily in Billboard, which led to even more editorial focus on music. The proliferation of the phonograph and radio also contributed to its growing music emphasis. Billboard published the first music hit parade on January 4, 1936, and introduced a "Record Buying Guide" in January 1939. In 1940, it introduced "Chart Line", which tracked the best-selling records, and was followed by a chart for jukebox records in 1944 called Music Box Machine charts. By the 1940s, Billboard was more of a music industry specialist publication. The number of charts it published grew after World War II, due to a growing variety of music interests and genres. It had eight charts by 1987, covering different genres and formats, and 28 charts by 1994.

By 1943, Billboard had about 100 employees. The magazine's offices moved to Brighton, Ohio, in 1946, then to New York City in 1948. A five-column tabloid format was adopted in November 1950 and coated paper was first used in Billboards print issues in January 1963, allowing for photojournalism. Sometime prior to September 1960, the name had been changed to The Billboard.

Billboard Publications Inc. acquired a monthly trade magazine for candy and cigarette machine vendors called Vend, and, in the 1950s, acquired an advertising trade publication called Tide. By 1969, Billboard Publications Inc. owned eleven trade and consumer publications, a publisher called Watson-Guptill Publications, a set of self-study cassette tapes, and four television franchises. It also acquired Photo Weekly that year.

Over time, subjects that Billboard still covered outside of music were spun-off into separate publications: Funspot magazine was created in 1957 to cover amusement parks, and Amusement Business was created in 1961 to cover outdoor entertainment. In January 1961, Billboard was renamed as Billboard Music Week to emphasize its newly exclusive interest in music. Two years later, it was renamed to just Billboard. According to The New Business Journalism, by 1984, Billboard Publications was a "prosperous" conglomerate of trade magazines, and Billboard had become the "undisputed leader" in music industry news. In the early 1990s, Billboard introduced Billboard Airplay Monitors, a publication for disc jockeys and music programmers. By the end of the 1990s, Billboard dubbed itself the "bible" of the recording industry.

Changes in ownership
Billboard struggled after its founder William Donaldson died in 1925, and, within three years, was once again heading towards bankruptcy. Donaldson's son-in-law Roger Littleford took over in 1928 and "nursed the publication back to health". His sons Bill and Roger became co-publishers in 1946 and inherited the publication in the late 1970s after Roger Littleford's death. They sold it to private investors in 1985 for an estimated $40 million. The investors cut costs and acquired a trade publication for the Broadway theatre industry called Backstage.

In 1987, Billboard was sold again to Affiliated Publications for $100 million. Billboard Publications Inc. became a subsidiary of Affiliated Publications called BPI Communications. As BPI Communications, it acquired The Hollywood Reporter, Adweek, Marketing Week, and Mediaweek, and also purchased Broadcast Data Systems, a high-tech firm for tracking music airtime. Private investors from Boston Ventures and BPI executives re-purchased a two-thirds interest in Billboard Publications for $100 million, and more acquisitions followed. In 1993, it created a division known as Billboard Music Group for music-related publications.

In 1994, Billboard Publications was sold to Dutch media conglomerate Verenigde Nederlandse Uitgeverijen (VNU) for $220 million. VNU acquired the Clio Awards in advertising and the National Research Group in 1997, as well as Editor & Publisher in 1999. In July 2000, it paid $650 million for the publisher Miller Freeman. BPI was combined with other entities in VNU in 2000 to form Bill Communications Inc. By the time CEO Gerald Hobbs retired in 2003, VNU had grown substantially larger, but had a large amount of debt from the acquisitions. An attempted $7 billion acquisition of IMS Health in 2005 prompted protests from shareholders that halted the deal; it eventually agreed to an $11 billion takeover bid from investors in 2006.

VNU then changed its name to Nielsen in 2007, the namesake of a company it acquired for $2.5 billion in 1999. New CEO Robert Krakoff divested some of the previously owned publications, restructured the organization, and planned some acquisitions before dying suddenly in 2007; he was subsequently replaced by Greg Farrar.

Nielsen owned Billboard until 2009, when it was one of eight publications sold to e5 Global Media Holdings. e5 was formed by investment firms Pluribus Capital Management and Guggenheim Partners for the purpose of the acquisition. The following year, the new parent company was renamed as Prometheus Global Media. Three years later, Guggenheim Partners acquired Pluribus' share of Prometheus and became the sole owner of Billboard.

In December 2015, Guggenheim Digital Media spun out several media brands, including Billboard, to its own executive Todd Boehly. The assets operate under the Hollywood Reporter-Billboard Media Group, a unit of the holding company Eldridge Industries.

1990s–present
Timothy White was appointed editor-in-chief in 1991, a position he held until his unexpected death in 2002. White wrote a weekly column promoting music with "artistic merit", while criticizing music with violent or misogynistic themes, and also reworked the publication's music charts. Rather than relying on data from music retailers, new charts used data from store checkout scanners obtained from Nielsen SoundScan. White also wrote in-depth profiles on musicians, but was replaced by Keith Girard, who was subsequently fired in May 2004. He and a female employee filed a $29 million lawsuit alleging that Billboard fired them unfairly with an intent to damage their reputations. The lawsuit claimed that they experienced sexual harassment, a hostile work environment, and a financially motivated lack of editorial integrity. Email evidence suggested that human resources were given special instructions to watch minority employees. The case was settled out-of-court in 2006 for a non-disclosed sum.

In the 2000s, economic decline in the music industry dramatically reduced readership and advertising from Billboards traditional audience. Circulation declined from 40,000 in circulation in the 1990s to less than 17,000 by 2014. The publication's staff and ownership were also undergoing frequent changes.

In 2004, Tamara Conniff became the first female and youngest-ever executive editor at Billboard, and led its first major redesign since the 1960s, by Daniel Stark and Stark Design. During her tenure, Billboard newsstand sales jumped 10%, ad pages climbed 22%, and conference registrations rose 76%. In 2005, Billboard expanded its editorial outside the music industry into other areas of digital and mobile entertainment. In 2006, after leading Billboard's radio publication, former ABC News and CNN journalist, Scott McKenzie, was named editorial director across all Billboard properties. Conniff launched the Billboard Women in Music event in 2007.

Bill Werde was named editorial director in 2008, and was followed by Janice Min in January 2014, also responsible for editorial content at The Hollywood Reporter. The magazine has since been making changes to make it more of a general interest music news source as opposed to solely an industry trade, branching out into covering more celebrity, fashion, and gossip. Min hired Tony Gervino as the publication's editor, which was unusual, in that he did not have a background in the music industry. Tony Gervino was appointed editor-in-chief in April 2014. An item on NPR covered a leaked version of Billboards annual survey, which it said had more gossip and focused on less professional topics than prior surveys. For example, it polled readers on a lawsuit that singer Kesha filed against her producer alleging sexual abuse.

Gervino was let go in May 2016. A note from Min to the editorial staff indicated that Senior Vice President of Digital Content Mike Bruno would serve as the head of editorial moving forward.
On June 15, 2016, BillboardPH, the first Billboard chart company in Southeast Asia, mainly in the Philippines, was announced. On September 12, 2016, Billboard expanded into China by launching Billboard China in a partnership with Vision Music Ltd.

On September 23, 2020, it was announced that Penske Media Corporation would assume operations of the MRC Media & Info publications under a joint venture with MRC known as PMRC. The joint venture includes management of Billboard.

News publishing
Billboard publishes a news website and weekly trade magazine that cover music, video and home entertainment. Most of the articles are written by staff writers, while some are written by industry experts. It covers news, gossip, opinion, and music reviews, but its "most enduring and influential creation" is the Billboard charts. The charts track music sales, radio airtime and other data about the most popular songs and albums. The Billboard Hot 100 chart of the top-selling songs was introduced in 1958. Since then, the Billboard 200, which tracks the top-selling albums, has become more popular as an indicator of commercial success. Billboard has also published books in collaboration with Watson-Guptill and a radio and television series called American Top 40, based on Billboard charts. A daily Billboard Bulletin was introduced in February 1997 and Billboard hosts about 20 industry events each year.

Billboard is considered one of the most reputable sources of music industry news. The website includes the Billboard Charts, news separated by music genre, videos, and a separate website. It also compiles lists, hosts a fashion website called Pret-a-Reporter, and publishes eight different newsletters. The print magazine's regular sections include:
 Hot 100: A chart of the top 100 most popular songs of the week
 Topline: News from the week
 The Beat: Hitmaker interviews, gossip and trends in the music industry
 Style: Fashion and accessories
 Features: In-depth interviews, profiles and photography
 Reviews: Reviews of new albums and songs
 Backstage pass: information about events and concerts
 Charts and CODA: More information about current and historical Billboard Charts

Listicles 
Billboard is known for publishing several annual listicles on its website, in recognition of the most influential executives, artists and companies in the music industry, such as the following:
 21 Under 21
 40 Under 40
Women in Music
 Billboard Dance 100
 Billboard Power 100
 Dance Power Players
 Digital Power Players
 Hip-Hop Power Players
 Indie Power Players
 Latin Power Players

See also
Billboard Argentina
Billboard Brasil
Billboard Candid Covers
Billboard Japan
Billboard K-Town
Billboard Mashup Mondays
Billboard Touring Awards
Billboard Türkiye
Top Heatseekers

Notes

References

External links

Archives 
 Billboard Archive on Google Books
 1940–2010 archived online by Google Books
 Charts since 1958, articles since 2001, reviews 2008-2016  archived online by Billboard
 World Radio History (1920–2014). Incomplete.

 
1894 establishments in Ohio
Magazines about the media
Magazines established in 1894
Magazines published in Cincinnati
Magazines published in New York City
Music magazines published in the United States
Professional and trade magazines
VNU Business Media publications
Weekly magazines published in the United States